Swedbank AB is a Nordic-Baltic banking group based in Stockholm, Sweden, offering retail banking, asset management, financial, and other services. In 2019 Swedbank had 900,000 private and 130,000 corporate clients and a 60%  market share of Estonia’s payments.

History
The first Swedish savings bank was founded in Gothenburg in 1820. In 1992, a number of local savings banks merged to create Sparbanken Sverige ("Savings Bank Sweden").  In 1995, this bank was listed on the Stockholm Stock Exchange and in 1997, it merged with Föreningsbanken under the combined name FöreningsSparbanken (abbreviated FSB).  During the late 2000s global financial crisis, Swedbank accepted government assistance due to its losses from loans made to neighboring Baltic economies.

On 8 September 2006, Föreningssparbanken AB changed its name to Swedbank AB. The name change took place in the afternoon local time, after the Swedish Companies Registration Office registered the changes in the company's articles of association. On the same date, the subsidiary AB Spintab changed its name to Swedbank Hypotek AB ("Swedbank Mortgage AB") and FöreningsSparbanken Jordbrukskredit AB changed its name to Swedbank Jordbrukskredit AB ("Swedbank Agricultural Credit AB"). Other subsidiaries will change their names at later dates.

Headquarters
The current Swedbank Headquarters was inaugurated in 2014, in Sundbyberg Municipality. The building was designed by 3XM.

Organisation

Swedbank has 7.25 million retail customers and 544,000 corporate customers in Sweden, Estonia, Latvia, and Lithuania.  The group has 252 branches in Sweden and in the Baltic countries.  It also maintains a presence in Copenhagen, Helsinki, New York City, Oslo, Shanghai and Johannesbourg.

Swedbank has close cooperation with about 60 local, but still independent, savings banks who chose not to join during the 1992 merger. These banks use FSB logos and customers have the same access to independent banks and branches belonging to FSB. Two relatively large independent savings banks, including the one in Skåne, have chosen not to cooperate with Swedbank and continue to use the logo used by Sparbanken before the merger with Föreningsbanken.

Together with the independent savings banks, Swedbank has branches all over Sweden. The bank has more than 15,000 employees across its operations in Sweden and abroad. Jens Henriksson is president and CEO, while former Swedish Prime Minister Göran Persson is chairman.

Market position
Swedbank is one of the primary banks in Sweden, together with Nordea, Handelsbanken, and SEB. In 2001, a deal to merge Swedbank (then FSB) with SEB failed as the European Commission thought that the merged company would have had too dominant a position in the Swedish banking market. Today, Swedbank has 4 million private customers in Sweden.

Money laundering 
On 20 February 2019 Swedish broadcaster SVT revealed that Swedbank is under investigation for alleged link in money laundering scandal by Estonian authorities due to suspicious transactions through Danske Bank which is being investigated in Denmark, Estonia, Britain, France and the United States. Estonian authorities confirmed findings by SVT. At least 40 billion Swedish crowns (£3.3 billion) had been transferred between accounts at Swedbank and Danske in the Baltics between 2007 and 2015, SVT's Uppdrag Granskning investigative programme reported. Chief executive Birgitte Bonnesen was fired in March 2019 during the money laundering scandal and her severance pay was cancelled. The bank's chairman Lars Idermark resigned the following month. Swedbank was subsequently fined a record SKr4bn ($380m) by Swedish and Estonian regulators.

On 4 January 2022, Swedish prosecutors indicted Bonnesen. A statement from the Swedish Economic Crime Authority said: ”The former CEO deliberately or recklessly, to the public and the bank’s stakeholders, disseminated misleading information about the bank’s efforts to stop, discover, preempt and report suspicious money-laundering in Swedbank’s operations in Estonia."

Patron of the University of Latvia 
Swedbank is a gold patron of the University of Latvia Foundation. Cooperation and support has been received from Swedbank since 2005 to promote the development of education in Latvia by donating to student events and activities. Major projects - Open Mind Research Fellowships 2007/2008. and 2008/2009. as well as annual support for the LU student festival "Aristotelis".

Interesting facts 
 Former lawyer of this bank Iryna Mudra in Ukraine became later Deputy Minister of Justice of Ukraine.

References

External links

Banks of Sweden
Companies based in Stockholm County
Banks established in 1820
Swedish brands
Companies listed on Nasdaq Stockholm
Banks under direct supervision of the European Central Bank
Swedish companies established in 1997